21 Jump Street is an American police procedural television series that aired on the Fox network and in first run syndication from April 12, 1987, to April 27, 1991, with a total of 103 episodes. The series focuses on a squad of youthful-looking undercover police officers investigating crimes in high schools, colleges, and other teenage venues. It was originally going to be titled Jump Street Chapel, after the deconsecrated church building in which the unit has its headquarters, but was changed at Fox's request so as not to mislead viewers into thinking it was a religious program.

Created by Patrick Hasburgh and Stephen J. Cannell, the series was produced by Patrick Hasburgh Productions and Stephen J. Cannell Productions in association with 20th Century Fox Television. Executive Producers included Hasburgh, Cannell, Steve Beers and Bill Nuss. The show was an early hit for the fledgling Fox network, and was created to attract a younger audience. The final season aired in first-run syndication mainly on local Fox affiliates. It was later rerun on the FX cable network from 1996 to 1998.

The series provided a spark to Johnny Depp's nascent acting career, garnering him national recognition as a teen idol. Depp found this status irritating, but he continued on the series under his contract and was paid $45,000 per episode. Eventually he was released from his contract after the fourth season.

A spin-off series, Booker, was produced for the character of Dennis Booker (Richard Grieco); it ran only one season, from September 24, 1989, to May 6, 1990.

A film adaptation directed by Phil Lord and Christopher Miller was released on March 16, 2012. The film is set in the same continuity as the series, with Johnny Depp, Holly Robinson and Peter DeLuise reprising their characters in cameo appearances. Richard Grieco and Dustin Nguyen also have cameos in the 2014 film sequel 22 Jump Street.

Premise
The series focuses on a group of police officers headquartered at the eponymous address. These young officers all have especially youthful appearances, allowing them to pass for teenagers. Their assignments generally consist of undercover work in high schools or, less commonly, colleges, where they generally investigate drug trafficking and abuse. The show's plots cover issues such as alcoholism, hate crimes, drug abuse, homophobia, AIDS, child abuse, and sexual promiscuity. Similarly, each problem is often solved by the end of the hour-long episode, giving an implicit moral about a particular activity's impact. When the show originally aired, some episodes were followed immediately by public service announcements featuring cast members.

Episodes

Cast

Jeff Yagher was originally cast as Officer Tom Hanson in the pilot. He was replaced after the original pilot episode was filmed, and his scenes were reshot with Johnny Depp. Midway through the first season, Frederic Forrest was replaced by Steven Williams. On the show, Forrest's character Richard Jenko is killed by a drunk driver.

Johnny Depp left the series at the end of the fourth season, but was credited in the first two episodes of the fifth season, despite not having appeared.

David Barry Gray's character was introduced at the end of the fourth season and starred in two episodes of season five with Alexandra Powers. Both episodes were filmed before the fourth season had ended but were not shown until the start of season five. Neither actor was approached in regards to portraying their character in the show's fifth and final season.
Michael DeLuise joined the cast part way through the fifth season and stayed on until late in the season.

Guest stars

Some notable guest stars on the series include:
Dom DeLuise, Josh Brolin, Mindy Cohn, Bridget Fonda, Bobby Rodriguez, Jada Pinkett Smith, Brad Pitt, Vince Vaughn, Barney Martin, Dann Florek, Blair Underwood, Shannen Doherty, John Waters, Rosie Perez, Kareem Abdul-Jabbar, Mario Van Peebles, Christina Applegate, Pauly Shore, David DeLuise, Bradley Gregg, Jason Priestley, Christopher Titus, Kurtwood Smith, Peri Gilpin, Sarah Buxton, David Paymer, Diedrich Bader, Russell Wong, Kelly Hu, Shannon Tweed, Tim Russ, Thomas Haden Church, Sherilyn Fenn, Rob Estes, Ray Walston, R.J. Williams, Robyn Lively, Peter Berg and Tracy Griffith.

Production

Filming
Set in a fictional city and state (Metropolis, Evergreen State) in the United States, the series was primarily filmed in Vancouver, British Columbia. It was one of the first major television series to use Vancouver as a filming location and helped to establish the city as a center for film production.

Reception
21 Jump Street, along with Married... with Children and The Tracey Ullman Show, debuted in the spring of 1987. All three shows were hits with audiences and helped to establish the then-newly launched Fox network. 21 Jump Street was the first hit series for the Fox network. In August, 21 Jump Street became the first Fox series to win its timeslot against a Big three network series. In the United Kingdom, it was shown on the similarly nascent, and interrelated, Sky One, which had yet to reach a sizeable audience.

Broadcast history

Season 4 was the last season to air on the Fox network. In commentary on the Season 5 DVD set, Peter DeLuise said that Fox had decided to cancel the show after Season 4 because the ratings had fallen below a set limit. Following this season Johnny Depp and Dustin Nguyen left the show. The departure of their characters was never explained in the narrative of the TV series, but in the movie it is explained that Hanson was transferred to the DEA and was later joined by Officer Penhall. The Booker spin-off crossover episode, "Wheels and Deals Part One", is included with 21 Jump Street'''s syndication package, and is also included on the fourth season DVD set.

Officer Dean Garrett (David Barry Gray) makes his first appearance in "Everyday is Christmas". As it became harder for the original cast members to plausibly pass as high school students, his character and Officer Kati Rocky (Alexandra Powers) were intended to be "youthful" replacements, so the show could maintain its original premise of younger looking cops posing as high school students.

Home media
Anchor Bay Entertainment released all five seasons of 21 Jump Street on DVD in Region 1 between 2004 and 2006.

On October 14, 2009, it was announced that Mill Creek Entertainment had acquired the rights to several Stephen J. Cannell series, including 21 Jump Street, and subsequently re-released the first four seasons. In addition, Mill Creek also released 21 Jump Street - The Complete Series, an 18-disc collection featuring all 103 episodes of the series on DVD on July 27, 2010.

On July 29, 2022, Visual Entertainment will release 21 Jump Street - The Complete Series on DVD in Region 1.

In Region 2, Anchor Bay Entertainment has released all 5 seasons on DVD in the UK. They also released a complete series set on March 5, 2012.

In Region 4, Madman Entertainment has released all five seasons on DVD in Australia. They also released a complete series collection on May 1, 2013.

In Region 2, Pidax Film released a complete series set box set on September 18, 2020, in Germany with all original music intact. German and English audio tracks.

Film adaptation

On March 16, 2012, a feature film sequel to the television series from Sony Pictures was released starring Jonah Hill and Channing Tatum (who are also executive producers) and directed by Phil Lord and Chris Miller with the screenplay written by Michael Bacall from a story by both Hill and Bacall. Johnny Depp, Peter DeLuise, and Holly Robinson briefly reprise their roles as Tom Hanson, Doug Penhall, and Judy Hoffs.

Described in concept by Hill as an "R-rated, insane, Bad Boys-meets-John Hughes-type movie," the film departs from the dramatic style of the series and instead features a comedic tone. The film and series are also set in the same continuity. A sequel titled 22 Jump Street'' was released in 2014.

References

External links

 
1987 American television series debuts
1991 American television series endings
1980s American crime drama television series
1990s American crime drama television series
1980s American high school television series
1990s American high school television series
1980s American police procedural television series
1990s American police procedural television series
English-language television shows
First-run syndicated television programs in the United States
Fox Broadcasting Company original programming
Television series by 20th Century Fox Television
Television series by Fremantle (company)
Television series by Stephen J. Cannell Productions
American detective television series
Television series created by Stephen J. Cannell
Television shows adapted into films
Television shows filmed in Vancouver
Television series about teenagers